Love Is All You Need? is a 2011 short film, directed by Kim Rocco Shields with Lexi DiBenedetto serving as the protagonist and narrator. The plot of the story takes place in a reversed society where homosexuality is the social norm and heterosexuality is considered taboo. In 2014, it was announced that the short would be adapted into a feature film, with Shields returning as the director and writer with some of the original cast returning. In 2016 the adapted film was released on iTunes in which Lexi DiBennedetto, star of the 2011 short the film is based on, reprises her role of Ashley

Plot
Narrated by Lexi DiBenedetto, the short begins with the birth of the lead character, Ashley, her mothers, Karen (Levy) and Vicki (Lazar) at the scene. The story moves on where Ashley describes her early troubles of being an in-the-closet heterosexual. One event included a church sermon that rejected opposite-sex relationships except for reproduction; another detailed her playing house with her friends in which Ashley was met with hostility after suggesting a heterosexual fake marriage for the game.

Ashley experiences several other events during her life. Her parents are unsupportive of heterosexuality, not knowing that their daughter is heterosexual, using heterophobic slurs like "breeder" and requesting that their children walk a different route to school after a straight couple move into their neighborhood. At school, she experiences physical and emotional bullying after it is discovered she is in a relationship with a male classmate (Dante Thorn). Upon being found out the classmate (Dante Thorn) denies their relationship in fear of being bullied by his older brother and peers at school. Later, his older brother and his companions physically attack Ashley and one of her own friends writes hetero on her forehead. Upon arriving home, her parents have received a phone call about their daughter's sexual orientation. Vicki proceeds to instruct Ashley to "march upstairs and get cleaned up". Karen, unlike her wife, disagrees, causing the two women to argue. Ashley begins to clean the marker from her face in the bathroom, where she later becomes overcome with emotion and decides to commit suicide due to the stress and violence her peers and parents put her through. As she bleeds from a self-inflicted wound, she continues to receive hateful text messages on her phone. At the end, Karen and Vicki eventually try to comfort Ashley through the door only to be met with silence, in fear they burst through the locked bathroom door to find Ashley's lifeless body.

Reception
Love Is All You Need? received mostly positive reviews. Reviewers on the Internet Movie Database have described the short film in acclaim, as "powerful," "thought provoking" and full of raw emotion. Film critic Jodie Mullen also gave a positive review, writing that the story was "truly inspirational". After viewing Love is All You Need? at the 2011 Atlanta Film Festival, Larry McGillicuddy wrote the film was "an incredibly powerful statement against bigotry, bullying, and oppression."

Feature film

After it was announced that the short would be adapted into a full-length movie, an additional story line was included, revolving around a female football player who enters a relationship with a male journalist. The film also includes Ashley's story and DiBennedetto reprises her role. Levy and Lazar also appear as a nurse and a "Female Commentator," respectively. Additional cast members include Elisabeth Röhm, Emily Osment, Mike Manning and Jeremy Sisto.

Impact 
The film's director, Kim Rocco Shields, states that her mission as a filmmaker is “to create a body of work that will create social change.” Love All You Need? was created to spark a social change and would see an end to LGBGTQIA+ bullying.  The film takes traditional misbeliefs about bullying and sex roles and flips them on their heads, and only by using this dystopian world can one realize the harmful assumptions one holds. The film allows us to see the destructive reality of bullying in a different light, one that has never shined before.  

By 2016,  Love Is All You Need? had garnered 30 million views on Youtube and Facebook. Upon its release, the film has since been used as an anti-bullying tool in schools all over America. Gail Rolf, education director of Friends of Project 10, shares the need and importance of the film “we need dialogue, we need education, and we need to talk about these issues of those who are stigmatized and victimized because of who they are”. The film has since been translated into 15 different languages worldwide and has sparked an international dialogue on human rights. Due to the film's inspiring impact, Rocco and her production team have made a full-length feature film Love Is All You Need (2016) in hopes of continuing to impact and inspire society.

Themes

Gender and Sexuality

Compulsory Heterosexuality/ Heteronormativity 
Compulsory heterosexuality, first coined by Adrienne Rich, is the idea that Heterosexuality is the norm in society, insinuating that queer relationships will never be deemed as valid as straight ones. Compulsory heterosexuality can be very harmful to members of the LGBTQIA+ community, as it causes many members to hide their relationships in fear of verbal and physical discrimination. Adrienne Rich established that although compulsory heterosexuality is harmful to all of society, it is especially harmful towards lesbians. Adrienne Rich builds this idea with her own personal experiences, stating that she went through the "lesbian suffering" that was needing to remain closeted in order to maintain a heterosexual front.

Gender norms 
In society, Gender norms govern the way men and women act and present themselves, largely due to a systemic foundation of outdated beliefs. Gender norms are not the same in every country, and differ due to political and societal standards. Gender stereotypes limit the emotional and physical capabilities of both men and women and push only for the characteristics that society considers acceptable, enforcing inequalities. The entirety of the LGBTQIA+ community will continue to break gender norms as long as heterosexuality is considered the norm in society. Gender norms affect members of the LGBTQIA+ community heavily, as queer relationships are often seen as a threat to homophobic people. Homophobic violence is the third highest category in global hate crimes.

Bullying

Anti-LGBTQIA+ violence 
 Young people in the LGBTQIA+ community experience bullying at a higher rate than their heterosexual peers. This bullying ranges from verbal to physical to cyber abuse. LGBTQIA+ youth who have been subjected to bullying have a higher rate of suicide. In a 2022 survey of LGBTQIA+ youth, those who experienced physical violence, enacted of threatened, within the past year attempted suicide at a rate that was three times higher than youth who were unaffected by physical violence or threat.

Cyberbullying 
Cyberbullying is bullying via technological platforms. These platforms are often social media outlets but can vary across digital spaces, including but not limited to text and direct messages, gaming platforms, various apps, and other realms that provide access to "content sharing." Cyberbullying can have profound effects on victims. Victims tend to have higher rates of anxiety and depression. An aspect of cyberbullying that makes it particularly damaging is the broad reach of digital communication. Unlike in-person physical violence, cyberbullying can happen at any time, in any setting, and can be both sustained and anonymous.

Suicide 
Suicide is the act of inflicting harm upon oneself "with the intent to die." It is one of the leading causes of death in America, specifically, but is a global phenomenon. Suicide is the third leading cause of death among American teenagers between the ages of 15 and 19. Though suicide affects people of different Socio-economic, geographic, and educational backgrounds, marginalized groups who are stigmatized in society see higher rates of suicidal thoughts and attempts. Included in these more susceptible groups are racial minorities, refugees, and members of the LGBTQIA+ community. In comparison to heterosexual peers in the same age group, young people who identify as LGBTQIA+ are four times more likely to attempt suicide.

Religion 
Homosexuality has been a controversial topic among society for centuries. Although some of the world has begun to ease on punishing those who are interested in same-sex relationships, religions remain strict on enforcing their rules against them. The history of the Catholic Church and homosexuality to be more specific, has been mostly negative in regards to accepting homosexuality. The film depicts a scene in which a Nun advocates against heterosexual relationships (the films interpretation of homosexuality), going as far as calling it an "abomination". With people being so devoted to their religious beliefs, they have no trouble opposing the views of communities such as LGBTQIA+.

References

External links

LGBT-related coming-of-age films
2011 films
LGBT-related films based on actual events
LGBT-related drama films
2011 LGBT-related films
Drama films based on actual events
2011 drama films
American LGBT-related short films
Films about suicide
2010s English-language films
2010s American films
Bullying and suicide
Mental health